Hamilton Cowles "Ham" Horton Jr. (August 6, 1931 – January 31, 2006) was a Republican member of the North Carolina General Assembly representing the state's thirty-first Senate district, including constituents in Forsyth county. Horton attended R. J. Reynolds High School from 1945 to 1949. He received his AB and LLB from UNC-Chapel Hill. He also served in the United States Navy as a Lieutenant from 1956 to 1960.  He also served for one year in the North Carolina House of Representatives from 1969 to 1970. An attorney from Winston-Salem, North Carolina, Horton served a combined eight terms in the state Senate, from 1971-1975 and 1995-2006. He previously served as Chief of Staff to Senator Jesse Helms from 1977 to 1978. He ran for North Carolina's 5th congressional district in the 1978 election. He lost to incumbent, Stephen L. Neal.

Senator Horton had a cancerous kidney removed in September after the 2005 legislative session. He died of cancer on January 31, 2006, at age 74. He was survived by his wife of 43 years and his daughter.

References

External links
 North Carolina Senate – Hamilton C. Horton Jr.

|-

|-

|-

|-

1931 births
2006 deaths
20th-century American politicians
21st-century American politicians
Candidates in the 1978 United States elections
Deaths from cancer
Members of the North Carolina House of Representatives
North Carolina Republicans
North Carolina state senators
United States Navy officers
University of North Carolina at Chapel Hill alumni
University of North Carolina School of Law alumni